Ford Motor Company's restructuring plan, made public in 2006, was known as The Way Forward. Ford was attempting to reduce fixed capital costs while maintaining a special focus on cars and car-based crossover vehicles. Over time, it hoped to make more of its product line profitable instead of relying on a limited portion of the products for profit. Making good profits across the product line required that the company reduce the costs of development and production while introducing new products that connect with consumers.

In the latter half of 2005, Chairman Bill Ford asked newly appointed Ford Americas Division President Mark Fields to develop a plan to return the company to profitability. Fields previewed the Plan, dubbed "The Way Forward", at the December 7, 2005 board meeting of the company; and it was unveiled to the public on January 23, 2006.  The plan was revised on September 15, 2006 to accelerate plant closings.

"The Way Forward" included resizing the company to match then current market realities, dropping some unprofitable and inefficient models, consolidating production lines, and shutting down seven vehicle assembly plants and seven parts factories. Among these were St. Louis Assembly (near St. Louis), Atlanta Assembly (near Atlanta), Batavia Transmission (Batavia, Ohio), Windsor Casting (Windsor, Ontario, Canada), and Wixom Assembly (Wixom, Michigan). Up to 30,000 hourly and salaried jobs (28% of the total workforce) in North America over the next six years were expected to be eliminated, which is comparable to similar cutbacks previously announced at General Motors. These cutbacks were consistent with Ford's roughly 25% decline in U.S. automotive market share since the mid-late 1990s.

New cars were developed faster using the new Global Product Development System (GPDS). This brought Ford's cycle time closer to its Japanese rivals. Ford also announced that it would have every vehicle in the Ford and Lincoln line up built on one of its nine new global platforms, cutting costs significantly. A new style for all Ford and Lincoln vehicles was introduced and Ford wanted "An unmistakable Ford or Lincoln look".

A joint venture with Mahindra and Mahindra Limited of India ended with the sale of Ford's 15 percent stake in 2005. Ford's realignment also included the sale of its wholly owned subsidiary, Hertz Rent-a-Car to a private equity group for $15 billion in cash and debt acquisition. The sale was completed on December 22, 2005. Some 15 years later, Hertz was declared bankrupt. 

While Ford had projected returning to profitability sometime after 2010, they beat this goal, and returned their first profit in 2009.

Plant closings 
Ford planned to close 14 manufacturing plants by 2012 including 7 that assembled cars. Short-term results (by 2008) reduced Ford's assembly capacity by 26%.

The first closures were announced on January 23, 2006.  Ford announced on April 13, 2006 that two more plants would close as well.  The plan was accelerated with a mid-September announcement which accelerated the closure of the Norfolk plant and added the Essex engine and Maumee stamping plants to the list.

Ford has kept the Essex Engine plant open to produce the 5.0 V8.

Product replacements 
The following products were assembled at the Wixom (Michigan) Assembly plant, which was closed. In June 2006, Ford announced that it will not move production to St. Thomas, Ontario, Canada (where its body-on-frame platform-mates Ford Crown Victoria and Mercury Grand Marquis are produced), likely meaning that Town Car production would end permanently.  Ford eventually changed its mind, announcing in September that it would move the Town Car after all.  As of 2011, production of the Town Car has been cancelled, with the MKT crossover intended as its replacement for livery fleets.

Staff reductions 
Up to 30,000 factory jobs would be eliminated with the downsizing envisioned in The Way Forward. The company also eliminated 4,000 salaried, contract, and agency jobs during the first quarter of 2006, and the company eliminated six or seven corporate officer positions out of 53 immediately.

Ford reportedly offered severance packages of up to $100,000 for workers who are willing to give up all future benefits except their pension. The company would also pay up to $15,000 in tuition for workers returning to school. Workers over 55 were reportedly offered a $35,000 bonus to retire early, provided they had 30 years of service with the company, and those with 28 years can get leave and 85% pay for two years.

Divestment 
Ford's plan called for divesting, selling, and closing some businesses in order to raise cash.
 Jaguar Cars and Land Rover — On 2 June 2008, Ford sold both of its British operations to Tata Motors of India for a cost of £1.7 billion.
 Aston Martin — On 12 March 2007, a British consortium led by Dave Richards of Prodrive purchased the iconic automaker for £479 million.
 Automobile Protection Corporation — Extended warranty company APCO will also be sold
 Mazda — On November 18, 2008, Ford announced that it would be selling a 20% stake in Mazda, bringing its stake to 13.4%, and surrendering control of the company.
 Mercury — On June 2, 2010, Ford officially announced the closure of Mercury by the end of Q4 of 2010.

New products 
Product plans reportedly called for more crossover SUVs, compact cars, and hybrid vehicles.

References

Notes 

Ford Motor Company